Hickory Hills is a census-designated place (CDP) in Foster Township, Luzerne County, Pennsylvania, southwest of the borough of White Haven. The CDP population was 562 at the 2010 census.

Geography

PA 940 forms the northern edge of the CDP, connecting it with White Haven (to the northeast) and Freeland (to the southwest).

Demographics

References

Census-designated places in Luzerne County, Pennsylvania
Census-designated places in Pennsylvania